DN73A is a national road in Romania that starts from Predeal, reaching Șercaia.

Road
The national road DN73A starts from the entrance to Predeal, coming from DN1 from Bucharest, goes by Cold River, goes down to Burzenland in Râșnov, where it intersects with DN73. Then it goes through the Old Tohan neighborhood of Zărnești city, reaches Poiana Mărului, and then it goes down to Țara Făgărașului, goes to Șinca Nouă, and then Șinca Veche. Between Șinca Veche and Ohaba, DN73A shares a segment with county road DJ104. From Ohaba, it goes through Vad, ending in Șercaia, at the intersection with DN1.

Historic and architectural monuments
 Râșnov Fortress
 Șinca
 Grota (Monastery) under Pleșul Hill, also known as Temple of Fate, from Șinca Veche.
 Monastic Hermitage Birth of Mary the Virgin from Șinca Veche.
 The Great Cave from Merești, in the Perșani Mountains, discovered in the 18th century where it was found ceramics marks from the first Age of Steel (Hallstatt culture).
 Bucium Monastery, near Bucium village.
 Fortified Saxon Church from Șercaia, attested in 1429, owned by Saint Katherine.
 Fortified Evangelical-Lutheran church from Halmeag, built in the second half of the 11th century, which illustrates the passing phase from Romanesque architecture to Gothic art.

Other places with touristic interests and nature monuments

 Predeal
 Ski area, with 5 areas
 Climatic Station Cold River
 Zărnești
 The City Day is celebrated each summer, in August: "Zărnești city days"-"Edelweiss Festival"
 National Park Stone of Crawl
 Șinca
 Perșani Baths from Perșani, with mineral springs
 Vad
 Plugarul, folkloric habit that takes place in the second day of Easter
 Poiana Narciselor from Vad, Nature reserve

Bibliography 

 ADAC Straßenatlas Ost-Europa, ADAC e.V. München, 1993
 Harta rutieră, Indexul localităților, România, Romania, Rumänien, Roumanie,1:700.000, Szarvas.Kárpátia, 2007 
 Nicolae Pepene, Bogdan Popovici, Victor Ștefănescu, Florina Rusu, O istorie a Râșnovului în imagini, Editura Suvenir, 2006

Notes

Roads in Romania
Brașov County